Broad Run is a tributary of the Potomac River in Loudoun County, Virginia.  The creek, located between Goose Creek and Sugarland Run, principally drains portions of eastern Loudoun County, as well as a small portion of western Fairfax County.

The watershed of the creek is 67.5 mi2 (175 km2) in Loudoun and 23.8 mi2 (62 km2) in Fairfax.

The majority of the run forms the border between the unincorporated areas of Ashburn and Sterling. The Broad Run Magisterial District of Loudoun and Broad Run High School derive their names from the waterway. The Broad Run Bridge and Tollhouse is a national listed historic site. 

The creek should not be confused with the nearby Broad Run (a tributary of the Occoquan River) that flows through Fauquier and Prince William Counties.

Tributaries
Tributaries are listed in order from the source of Broad Run to its mouth.

Lenah Run
South Fork Broad Run
Cabin Branch 1
Horsepen Run
Indian Creek
Stallion Branch
Cabin Branch 2
Beaverdam Run
Russell Branch

See also

Broad Run (Occoquan River)
Broad Run (Maryland)

References

 United States Geological Survey. Reston, VA. "Broad Run." Geographic Names Information System (GNIS). Accessed 2010-08-30.

Rivers of Loudoun County, Virginia
Rivers of Virginia
Tributaries of the Potomac River